Willkie Farr & Gallagher LLP, commonly known as Willkie, is a white-shoe, international law firm headquartered in New York City. Founded in 1888, the firm specializes in corporate practice and employs approximately 1000 lawyers in 13 offices across six countries. U.S. Supreme Court Justices Felix Frankfurter and Charles Evans Hughes began their careers at the firm, as did former Supreme Court nominee Robert Bork, and former New York Governor Mario Cuomo after leaving office. Willkie was ranked among the top ten in The American Lawyers "The 2021 A-List" ranking of elite law firms. The law firm's profits per equity partner were $3.90 million in 2021.

History

The firm was founded in 1888, with four lawyers. The firm started as Wall Street law firm Hornblower & Byrne, which was founded by William B. Hornblower and James Byrne, and was located at 280 Broadway in New York City. Hornblower was a prominent ally of President Grover Cleveland and rose to serve as President of the Association of the Bar of the City of New York, as well as sit as a judge on the New York Court of Appeals.

Early clients in the 1890s included the New York Life Insurance Company; the New York Securities and Trust Company (later the New York Trust Company); The Rome, Watertown, Ogdensburg and Parsons Railroad; Grant & Ward, a brokerage firm partnership between ex-President Ulysses S. Grant and Ferdinand Ward; the Otis Elevator Company; the United States Ship Building Company; and Thomas A. Edison.

Two associates, Felix Frankfurter (who started his legal career at the firm in 1906) and Charles Evans Hughes, have served as Justices of the US Supreme Court, with Hughes serving as Chief Justice.

Two partners have served as American Bar Association President. The first was Charles A. Boston (who became an associate at the firm in 1901 when it was Hornblower, Byrne, Miller & Potter) in 1930–31. He was followed by Harold J. Gallagher (who initially joined the firm in 1917 when it was Hornblower, Miller & Garrison) in 1949–50.

In 1931, the firm merged with the law firm of Miller, Otis and Farr. At that point, in total the firm had 12 partners and 24 associates, making it one of New York's larger firms. In 1939, the firm hired its first female associate, Mary MacDonagh.

In January 1940 Harold J. Gallagher, one of the most influential partners in the history of the firm, extended an offer to Wendell Willkie to join the firm then known as Miller, Boston & Owen. This was several months before Willkie received the Republican nomination for president. After losing the Presidential election to the incumbent FDR, Willkie joined the firm and became a partner in 1941. The firm's name was changed a year later to Willkie, Owen, Otis & Bailly, and later to Willkie, Owen, Otis, Farr & Gallagher. Willkie later became F.D.R.'s personal envoy to many countries, promoting the Lend-Lease program. He later wrote a book about his travels entitled One World, a plea for global cooperation and peacekeeping. In 1947, his estate's interest in the law firm was valued at $125,000 ($ in current dollar terms). That year, the customary hourly rate of a Willkie partner was $50 ($ in current dollar terms) an hour.

Major clients during this period included insurance companies such as Metropolitan Life Insurance Company; New York Life; Equitable; Aetna; Connecticut General; John Hancock; and Prudential for which the firm represented for a number of industry private placements.

Throughout the 1960s, Gallagher-lead Willkie was occupied with railroad reorganizations, setting the stage for the firm's emergence as a bankruptcy powerhouse. In 1968 the firm adopted its current name, Willkie Farr & Gallagher. From 1969 to 1995, Bob Hodes was the Chairman of the firm.  In 1977, Patricia S. Skigen became the firm's first female partner. That year, the firm moved to One Citicorp Center.

The firm was long known for its representation of Major League Baseball. Former Willkie Farr partner Bowie Kuhn served as Commissioner of Baseball from 1969–1984. Willkie Farr represented Major League Baseball in the famous Curt Flood free agency/antitrust case in the United States Supreme Court in 1970, and successfully litigated famous cases such as the Pine Tar Game in 1983 as well as, later in the 1980s, against Pete Rose regarding the highly publicized gambling case.

In 1993 Willkie suffered a precipitous drop in business when Shearson Lehman, which accounted for one-third of Willkie Farr billings, was sold to The Travelers Companies. The firm consequently adopted a policy that no client would account for more than five percent of its business.

In 1994, corporate partner Nora Ann Wallace became the first female member of the firm's Executive Committee. Beginning in 1995, and for the next two decades, Mario Cuomo (the former 52nd Governor of New York, the Lieutenant Governor of New York, and the Secretary of State of New York) was of counsel at Willkie Farr.

In 2003, carbon monoxide and smoke inhalation from a fire at a historic bed-and-breakfast in Charlottesville, Virginia, where members of the firm were staying on a recruiting trip, killed Willkie recruiting coordinators Trish Langlade and Billie Kelly.

In 2007, Willkie announced a strategic alliance with Dickson Minto, a boutique law firm with offices in London and Edinburgh that specializes in private equity, with both continuing to operate independently of each other. Willkie was recognized in 2015 as being in 'Band 1' (the top ranking) on the national scale for its work in eight practice areas according to Chambers & Partners.

In 2019, Gordon Caplan, then co-chairman of the firm, named 2018 “Dealmaker of the Year” by The American Lawyer,<ref>Rick Mitchell. "Others, in College Entrance Bribery Case", March 13, 2019, Bloomberg Law, BigLaw Business.com. Retrieved March 14, 2019.</ref> was indicted as a parent participant in the 2019 college admissions bribery scandal, for conspiracy to commit mail fraud and wire fraud; the firm placed him on indefinite leave the next day."Willkie's Gordon Caplan Is Obscure No More",The American Lawyer. A felony guilty plea deal was filed in March 2019, and he was sentenced to one month in prison.Andrew E. Lelling, U.S. Department of Justice, District of Massachusetts, March 27, 2019. Retrieved April 9, 2019.The American Lawyer ranked Willkie Farr 47th in gross revenue, with $772 million in 2017, and in the 2018 Global 200 survey it was ranked the 57th-highest-grossing law firm in the world. It had 145 equity partners, and its profits per equity partner were $2.97 million, 17th-highest in the nation."The 100 Top Law Firms by Profits Per Partner in 2018"  In size, it was ranked the 68th-largest law firm in the United States.

Attorneys
The top represented law schools at Willkie Farr include New York University School of Law (the school representing the highest number of firm partners), Harvard Law School, University of Pennsylvania Law School, Columbia Law School, Georgetown University Law Center and University of Virginia Law School.

Notable partners
 Norman Bay – former Chairman of the Federal Energy Regulatory Commission.

Affiliations

In 2022, Willkie Farr & Gallagher was a founding member of the Legal Alliance for Reproductive Rights, a coalition of United States law firms offering free legal services to people seeking and providing abortions in the wake of Dobbs v. Jackson Women's Health Organization, which overruled Roe v. Wade.

Notable alumni
Academia
 Robert Bork – Professor, Yale Law School; Solicitor General of the United States;  judge on the U.S. Court of Appeals for the D.C. Circuit
 Danielle Citron – Professor, University of Virginia School of Law
Roberta Karmel – first female SEC Commissioner, Centennial Professor of Law & Co-Director, Center for the Study of International Business Law, Brooklyn Law School
 Pamela Samuelson – Distinguished Professor & Director, Berkeley Center for Law & Technology; U.C. Berkeley School of Law
 Donald J. Weidner – Dean, Florida State University College of Law
 Harold G. Wren – Dean and Professor of Law, the Brandeis School of Law at the University of Louisville, the Northwestern School of Law, Lewis & Clark College (1969–72), and the T.C. Williams School of Law at the University of Richmond.The Virginia Bar Association Journal 

Government service
 Norman Bay – U.S. Attorney for the District of New Mexico; first Chinese-American U.S. Attorney; Chairman of the Federal Energy Regulatory Commission.
 Robert Bork – U.S. Solicitor General 
 Mario Cuomo – the 52nd Governor of New York, the Lieutenant Governor of New York, and the Secretary of State of New York.
 Lindley Miller Garrison – U.S. Secretary of War during World War I
 David Goodfriend – Deputy Staff Secretary to President William J. Clinton
 Charles Evans Hughes – U.S. Secretary of State; 36th Governor of New York
 Craig Johnson – New York State Senator
 Roberta Karmel – Commissioner of the Securities Exchange Commission, 1983-1987
 Sean Patrick Maloney – United States Representative for New York's 18th District
 Nathan Lewis Miller – 43rd Governor of New York
 Benito Romano – U.S. Attorney for the Southern District of New York; first Puerto Rican to hold the U.S. Attorney post
 Wendell Willkie – 1940 US Presidential candidate, and author of One WorldJudiciary
 Felix Frankfurter – Associate Justice, U.S. Supreme Court
 Charles Evans Hughes – Chief Justice, U.S. Supreme Court; U.S. Secretary of State; Governor of New York
 William Hornblower – Judge, New York Court of Appeals; Supreme Court nominee; President of New York City Bar Association
 Chester J. Straub – Judge, U.S. Court of Appeals for the Second Circuit
 Rachel Freier – Judge, New York City Criminal Court; first Hasidic Jewish woman to hold public office in United States history; was a paralegal at Willkie Farr.
 Elizabeth Stong - Bankruptcy Judge since 2003 in the EDNY, former litigation partner.

Miscellaneous
 Kenneth Bialkin – Chairman of the Anti-Defamation League of B’nai B’rith; Chairman of the Conference of Presidents of Major American Jewish Organizations; co-Chairman of Willkie FarrJames F. Peltz (December 30, 1986). "Lawyers, Bankers Rush To Close Deals by Yearend"
 Charles A. Boston – President, American Bar Association
 Louis A. Craco – President, New York City Bar Association
 Harold J. Gallagher – President, American Bar Association
 Bowie Kuhn – Major League Baseball (MLB) Commissioner
 Paul Mecurio – Emmy Award-winning comedian; writer on The Daily Show with Jon Stewart''
 Susan Thomases – Personal counsel and adviser to Hillary Clinton

Locations

The firm has 700 lawyers, in 13 offices in six countries (including offices in New York, Washington, D.C., Houston, Palo Alto, Paris - created in 1921, London, Rome, Milan, Frankfurt, and Brussels).

See also
List of largest law firms by profits per partner

References

External links
Official website

Law firms based in New York City
Law firms established in 1888
1888 establishments in New York (state)
Companies based in Manhattan
Law firms with offices in foreign countries